Petru Tamba (born 19 December 1990) is a Romanian rugby union player. He plays in the prop position for amateur Super 10 club L'Aquila and formally for București based European Challenge Cup side the Wolves. He also plays for Romania's national team the Oaks.

References

External links

1990 births
Living people
Romanian rugby union players
Romania international rugby union players
Rugby union props